Pat McCarthy (born 1950) is an Irish former Gaelic footballer who played as a midfielder for the Kerry and Kildare senior teams.

A nephew of 1940s player, Phil McCarthy, Pat McCarthy was a naturally strong player with excellent hands and a good jump.
He was part of the Kerry Under-21 team in the early 1970s but had to wait till the demise of the great Mick O'Connell and the failure of young midfield pretenders like DJ Crowley and John O'Keeffe before getting a proper chance on the senior squad in 1975 under Mick O'Dwyer. He soon became the obvious partner to Paudie Lynch. Many times that season he did most of the heavier lifting at midfield where his strength maintained control against opponents who played rough or fair.
McCarthy made his first championship appearance for the team during the 1975 championship and became a regular member of the starting fifteen over subsequent seasons. During that time he won one All-Ireland winner's medal and three Munster winner's medals in four championship seasons.

McCarthy's greatest display was in the 1976 Munster final - a game regarded by many sportswriters as the greatest game of Gaelic football ever. Against a surprisingly determined Cork team, Kerry were taken to equal scores after 70 minutes. In extra time McCarthy's strength and inspirational determination from midfield singlehandedly turned the tide for Kerry, who won out in the end by 3-20 to 2-19. In that year's All-Ireland final however Kerry lost by 3-8 to 0-10 to a resurgent Dublin team.
No doubt his being based neither in Kerry nor in Dublin did not count in his favour as far as training was concerned. That year also saw the start of Jack O'Shea as a new midfielder for Kerry, with his future partner, Sean Walsh also being brought in - initially as a substitute in the forward line. Nonetheless many people felt that McCarthy deserved more senior outings for Kerry than he received from Mick O'Dwyer over subsequent seasons.

McCarthy later switched to playing his football in Kildare, playing club football for Sallins and league/championship senior games for Kildare.
When his playing days finished, McCarthy was involved in coaching and selector for the Kildare county team, notably for their nearly successful championship season in 1998 when they defeated Kerry in the semi-final but lost to Galway in the All-Ireland final.

At club level, McCarthy played with both the Churchill club in Kerry and later with Sallins in Kildare.

He remains a reasonably frequent and always welcome visitor to Kerry, particularly to his home parish, Churchill, where his sporting achievements remain a matter of great pride to many local people.

References

External links
 

1950 births
Living people
Churchill Gaelic footballers
Sallins Gaelic footballers
Kerry inter-county Gaelic footballers
Kildare inter-county Gaelic footballers
Munster inter-provincial Gaelic footballers
People from Tralee
Winners of one All-Ireland medal (Gaelic football)